Vice-Admiral Thomas Pringle (died 8 December 1803) was a British officer of the Royal Navy. He served during the American War of Independence, and the French Revolutionary and Napoleonic Wars.

Family and early life
He was born into a wealthy Scottish family, the only son of Walter Pringle, a prosperous West Indies planter. Stationed at Quebec as American forces approached, Pringle was sent to Britain in November 1775 aboard the merchant vessel Polly, with despatches warning of the imminent American attack.

Command
Pringle was briefly captain of the armed ship Lord Howe. He left her and in October 1776, he commanded the Royal Navy fleet on Lake Champlain in the Battle of Valcour Island, where he defeated a smaller American fleet under the command of Benedict Arnold. On his return to England in November 1776 he was promoted to post-captain. He served well there, capturing a number of American naval vessels, transports, and privateers, including the
Virginia State Navy brig Mosquito on 5 June 1777, and the privateer Johnston on 29 November 1777.

Pringle operated for the next two years with Admiral Samuel Barrington's fleet, seeing action at the Battle of St. Lucia on 14/15 December 1778, and at the Battle of Grenada on 6 July 1779. Pringle sailed home with Barrington and paid off Ariadne for a refit in early 1780. He also operated in British waters, capturing the privateer Moustic in the English Channel on 20 January 1782.

The Nelson connection
In April 1782 he escorted a convoy from Cork to Quebec. Joining him for this task, and placed under his command, was Captain Horatio Nelson, in command of the frigate . Nelson was not looking forward to the tedious and difficult task of escorting a convoy through the Atlantic storms, nor did he rate Pringle highly, thinking that Pringle wanted to go to Canada only because of the money he could make shipping specie. In the event Nelson found the voyage to be not as bad as he had feared and also realised that he had misjudged Pringle, subsequently declaring that Pringle was 'my particular friend, and a man of great honour.' Nelson and Pringle's friendship was an enduring one. The day after Nelson's marriage to Frances Nisbet in 1787 Pringle wryly remarked that the navy had lost its 'greatest ornament', so expressing his concern that a wife got in the way of a successful naval career.

The Peace, and the French Revolutionary Wars
Pringle returned to Britain at the end of 1782, in time to capture another privateer in the Channel, this time the Légère on 11 December 1782. Daedalus was assigned to patrol the Shetland fisheries in 1783, before Pringle paid her off in July 1784. He is recorded to have recommissioned the hulked 74-gun third rate  in October 1787 as a receiving ship at Chatham Dockyard, though had moved later that month to take command of the new 90-gun second rate .

In October 1793 he was given command of the 74-gun , joining Lord Howe's fleet. Pringle was therefore present at the Glorious First of June the following year, where his ship had two killed and nine wounded. He was awarded the Naval Gold Medal for his part in the action, and promoted to rear-admiral that year.

Flag rank
In 1795 Pringle, by now a rear-admiral, raised his flag aboard the 74-gun  and served in the North Sea. He was in Saldanha Bay under Vice-Admiral George Elphinstone when a squadron of the Batavian Navy under Rear-Admiral Engelbertus Lucas was forced to surrender on 17 August 1796. His legacy as commander of the navy on the Cape station was commemorated in the naming of Pringle Bay.

In 1797, he had to put down a mutiny aboard his flagship which was anchored in the harbour.  The seamen aboard the ship had threatened their captain, George Hopewell Stephens, with a court-martial composed of members of the crew on charges of cruelty and mistreatment. The mutinous spirit was temporarily quashed with a general pardon, while Stephens requested a regular court-martial to clear his name. While this was held aboard , Pringle sent a ship to recall the Tremendouss previous captain, Charles Brisbane. Stephens was honourably acquitted at the court-martial and returned to duty, but shortly afterwards the crew of the Tremendous broke out into open mutiny, this spreading to other ships in the harbour. Pringle, who was onshore at the time, ordered the batteries around the harbour to be manned, and aimed at the Tremendous, the source of the mutiny. With over 100 guns pointed at his flagship he demanded the crews return to obedience and give up the ringleaders within two hours, or he would order the Tremendous destroyed. Realising that Pringle was sincere in his intent, the mutineers surrendered 10 minutes before Pringle's deadline passed. The ringleaders were handed over and order was restored to the fleet.

On 14 February 1799, Pringle was promoted to Vice Admiral of the White, and on 1 January 1801, to Vice Admiral of the Red. He died in Edinburgh on 8 December 1803.

Notes

References

Further reading
 Contains correspondence concerning the mutiny on board the Tremendous.

1803 deaths
Royal Navy personnel of the French Revolutionary Wars
Royal Navy personnel of the American Revolutionary War
Royal Navy vice admirals
Year of birth missing